Paper hanger may refer to:

 A tradesman who applies wallpaper to a wall
 Cheque fraud, the unlawful use of cheques
 Paper hanger (Mundelein's speech), given by Cardinal George Mundelein regarding Adolf Hitler before World War II
 "Paper Hanger", song by American band mewithoutYou, on album Catch for Us the Foxes